Events from the year 1583 in Sweden

Incumbents
 Monarch – John III

Events

 10 August - The Livonian War is ended by the Treaty of Plussa. 
 - Creation of the - Diocese of Mariestad
 - A new sumptuary law bans the use of velvet for hats and jackets and silk skirts for women not belonging to the nobility.

Births

 16 June - Axel Oxenstierna, statesman (died 1654 in Sweden)

Deaths

 16 September - Catherine Jagiellon, queen (born 1526)
 - Sofia Johansdotter Gyllenhielm, illegitimate royal daughter  (born 1556)

References

 
Years of the 16th century in Sweden
Sweden